Progressive National Party can refer to the following political parties

Progressive National Party (Panama)
Progressive National Party (Suriname)
Progressive National Party (Turks and Caicos Islands)

See also
PNP (disambiguation)
Progressive Party (disambiguation)
National Progressive Party (disambiguation)